The Football Conference season of 1989–90 (known as the GM Vauxhall Conference for sponsorship reasons) was the eleventh season of the Football Conference.

Overview
Darlington, relegated to the Conference from the Fourth Division a year earlier, finished the season as Conference champions and regained their Football League status at the first attempt – just as Lincoln City had done two years earlier. Coming down to the Conference from the Football League were the bottom placed Fourth Division club Colchester United.

New teams in the league this season
 Barrow (promoted 1988–89)
 Darlington (relegated from the Football League 1988–89)
 Farnborough Town (promoted 1988–89)
 Merthyr Tydfil (promoted 1988–89)

Final league table

Results

Top scorers in order of league goals

Promotion and relegation

Promoted
 Darlington (to the Football League Fourth Division)
 Bath City (from the Southern Premier League)
 Gateshead (from the Northern Premier League)
 Slough Town (from the Isthmian League)

Relegated
 Colchester United (from the Football League Fourth Division)
 Chorley (to the Northern Premier League)
 Enfield (to the Isthmian League)
 Farnborough Town (to the Southern Premier League)

References

External links
 1989–90 Conference National Results

National League (English football) seasons
5